Cameron Norrie defeated Nikoloz Basilashvili in the final, 3–6, 6–4, 6–1 to win the men's singles tennis title at the 2021 Indian Wells Masters. It was his first ATP Tour Masters 1000 title, and he became the first Briton to win the title. Basilashvili became the first Georgian to reach a Masters-level final since Alex Metreveli in 1968, and the first to do so while representing Georgia as an independent nation.

Dominic Thiem was the reigning champion from when the event was last held in 2019, but did not participate due to a long-standing wrist injury.

With no former champions participating, a new Indian Wells champion was guaranteed. For the first time, all four semifinalists at a Masters event were ranked outside of the world's top 25.

Seeds
All seeds received a bye into the second round.

Draw

Finals

Top half

Section 1

Section 2

Section 3

Section 4

Bottom half

Section 5

Section 6

Section 7

Section 8

Qualifying

Seeds

Qualifiers

Qualifying draw

First qualifier

Second qualifier

Third qualifier

Fourth qualifier

Fifth qualifier

Sixth qualifier

Seventh qualifier

Eighth qualifier

Ninth qualifier

Tenth qualifier

Eleventh qualifier

Twelfth qualifier

References

External links
 Main draw
 Qualifying draw

Men's Singles